Jonathan Sela, ASC (born April 29, 1978) is a French-born Israeli cinematographer. He has shot numerous commercials, music videos and feature films, including John Wick, The Midnight Meat Train, Transformers: The Last Knight, and Deadpool 2, as well as numerous collaborations with directors John Moore and David Leitch.

Life and career 
Sela was born in Paris, France. At the age of 10, his Polish grandfather took him to the set of Schindler's List in Kraków, which inspired him to pursue a career in filmmaking. Four years later, he began working in Israel as a cameraman and lighting technician on numerous television films and shows, first as lighting technician, then as gaffer. He emigrated to the United States at age 19, enrolling in the American Film Institute in Los Angeles. He served as assistant to cinematographer Vilmos Zsigmond for two films before making his debut as director of photography with the music video for Cypress Hill's Lowrider. After shooting several shorts, he made his feature film debut with the 2004 comedy film Soul Plane. In 2006, he shot the remake of The Omen, the first of several collaborations with director John Moore. In 2008 he shot both the Clive Barker adaptation The Midnight Meat Train and Max Payne; a neo-noir action film based on the critically acclaimed video game of the same name. Some of Sela's more recent projects include the F. Gary Gray-directed crime drama Law Abiding Citizen, the fifth entry of the Die Hard film series A Good Day to Die Hard, and the action thriller John Wick. Sela was director of photography on 2017's Transformers: The Last Knight, the fifth entry in the science fiction action franchise. Sela has also worked on commercials for companies like Verizon Wireless, KFC, Gillette, and Mary Kay, and has shot music videos for artists like Rihanna and Green Day.

Sela was invited into the American Society of Cinematographers in December 2022.

Personal life
Sela lives in Venice, California with his wife, photographer Megan Schoenbachler, and their two sons.

Filmography

Television

Music videos

References

External links
 

1978 births
Living people
Cinematographers from Paris
Israeli cinematographers
Israeli emigrants to the United States
Israeli people of French-Jewish descent